Jihad El-Achkar (born 13 January 1962) is a Lebanese judoka. He competed in the men's half-lightweight event at the 1984 Summer Olympics.

References

External links

1962 births
Living people
Lebanese male judoka
Olympic judoka of Lebanon
Judoka at the 1984 Summer Olympics
Place of birth missing (living people)